Michael Corbett is an American television and Broadway actor and entertainment journalist.  He is perhaps best known for his work starring in three daytime soap operas.

Acting career
Corbett began his career on Broadway.  Just two weeks out of college at the Boston Conservatory of Music, he landed a role in the Broadway Musical Nefertiti starring Andrea Marcoucci. 
He then went on to play Kenicki in Grease, and the Broadway Production of Come Back Little Sheba starring Shirley Knight and Philip Bosco. He also starred Off-Broadway with Liz Callaway and Karen Mason in The Matinee Kids. While on Broadway, Corbett was cast as Michael Pavel Jr. on Ryan's Hope, by a casting director who had seen him in a play. He played the role from 1979 to 1981.

Corbett played Warren Carter on Search for Tomorrow from 1982 to 1985, and he later portrayed secretary-turned-murderer David Kimble on The Young and the Restless from 1986 to 1991. Corbett has also guest starred on numerous television series including The King of Queens, Star Trek: The Next Generation as Dr. Rabal, and Zoey 101 as Logan's father, Malcolm Reese, and the web series Venice: The Series.

Since 2000, Corbett has hosted real estate and lifestyle segments for the NBC entertainment news program Extra, and won a 2014 Daytime Emmy Award for Outstanding Entertainment News Program as part of the show's team. He is also the host and senior producer of Extra's Mansions and Millionaires!, and the executive producer of Hollywood Medium with Tyler Henry on E!. Corbett also created and executive produced Mansion Hunters for the Reelz channel.

Corbett appears as a real estate expert on television shows including The View, Good Day LA, and the Australian show Today. He also regularly appears on CNN, the Discovery Channel, ABC News, Fox News, the Fine Living Network, The Tyra Banks Show, CBS News, and had a long feature run on Larry King Live. He has been featured in People magazine, Newsweek, Robb Report, The Los Angeles Times, and The New York Times. He also hosted and lectured on the Real Estate & Wealth Expo’s twelve-city national tour.

Corbett has written three best selling real estate books: Before You Buy: The Homebuyer’s Handbook for Today’s Market!, Find It, Fix it, Flip It! Make Millions in Real Estate—One House at a Time, and Ready, Set, Sold!, The Insider Secrets to Sell Your House Fast—for Top Dollar!.

Personal life
Corbett was born on 20 June 1956. He was a resident of Collingswood, New Jersey, and the first house he bought was next door to his grandmother's home there.

References

External links

Living people
Male actors from Philadelphia
American business writers
American real estate businesspeople
American male soap opera actors
American male television actors
American television hosts
American television reporters and correspondents
Businesspeople from Pennsylvania
People from Collingswood, New Jersey
Writers from Philadelphia
Entertainment journalists
Year of birth missing (living people)